The Roman Catholic Diocese of Chosica is a diocese located in the city of Chosica in the Ecclesiastical province of Lima in Peru.

History
 January 11, 1997: Established as Diocese of Chosica from the Metropolitan Archdiocese of Lima

Bishops

Ordinaries
Norbert Klemens Strotmann Hoppe, M.S.C. (since January 11, 1997)

Auxiliary bishop
Arthur Joseph Colgan, C.S.C. (2015-)

See also
Roman Catholicism in Peru

References

Sources
 GCatholic.org
 Catholic Hierarchy
  Diocese website

Roman Catholic dioceses in Peru
Roman Catholic Ecclesiastical Province of Lima
Christian organizations established in 1997
Roman Catholic dioceses and prelatures established in the 20th century